This is a list of main career statistics of Spanish former professional tennis player Àlex Corretja.

Grand Slam tournaments

Singles: (2 runner-ups)

Other significant finals

Year-end championships finals

Singles: 1 (1 title)

Olympics medal matches

Doubles: 1 (1 bronze medal)

Masters Series tournaments

Singles: 5 (2 titles, 3 runner-ups)

Career finals

ATP career finals

Singles: 30 (17 titles, 13 runner-ups)

Doubles: 7 (3 titles, 4 runner-ups)

Other finals

ATP Challengers and ITF Futures

Singles: 1 (1 runner-up)

Doubles: 2 (2 runner-ups)

Performance timelines

Singles 

1Held as Stuttgart Masters until 2001, Madrid Masters from 2002 to 2008.

Doubles 

1Held as Stuttgart Masters until 2001, Madrid Masters from 2002 to 2008.

Record against top-10 players

Top-10 wins per season

Career Grand Slam tournament seedings 
The tournaments won by Corretja are bolded.

Singles

Doubles

National participation

Team competitions finals: 2 (1 title, 1 runner-up) 

Corretja, Alex

References